John Hawkins was an American politician from Maryland. He served as a member of the Maryland House of Delegates, representing Harford County in 1849.

Career
Hawkins served as a member of the Maryland House of Delegates, representing Harford County in 1849.

References

Year of birth missing
Year of death unknown
People from Harford County, Maryland
Members of the Maryland House of Delegates